Pran Jaye Per Vachan Na Jaye is a 1974 Hindi-language action film directed by  S. Ali Raza. It stars Sunil Dutt, Rekha, Bindu, Ranjeet, Jeevan, Madan Puri, Premnath, Iftekhar, Jayshree T. The music is by O. P. Nayyar.

Plot
Raja Thakur (Sunil Dutt) is an outlaw who fights oppression and corruption in his own unique way. This Robin Hood like figure is a feared and respected figure among the villagers and when he attends a dance performance given by the famous dancer Janiya (Rekha), he finds himself attracted to her. He shows his feelings openly but this proves to be a hindrance to Janiya - people now consider her to be the exclusive property of the outlaw and fear to ask her to perform for them. A rival gang kidnaps Janiya and invoke the wrath of Raja Thakur. Now Raja Thakur will have to leave the rural area, where he rules, and go into an unknown territory, to deal with unknown gangsters, and he must do so in order to keep his word.

Cast
Sunil Dutt	as Raja Thakur
Rekha as Janiya
Bindu as Lily
Ranjeet as Bandit
Jeevan as	Dharamdas
Madan Puri	as Jagmohan 
Premnath as Mangal Singh
Iftekhar as Dhanraj
Jayshree T. as Dancer / Singer

Music
The music was composed by O. P. Nayyar and the lyrics were by S. H. Bihari & Ahmed Wasi. All songs are sung by Asha Bhosle. Asha Bhosle won Filmfare Best Female Playback Singer for the song, "Chain Se Humko Kabhi". Though this song was never used in film.

Location 
 Jabalpur
 Bhedaghaat
 DhuanDhaar
 Bandar Kundni
 Panchivati Ghaat
 Narmada Ghaat
 Jabalpur city

Awards
 Filmfare Best Female Playback Singer Award for Asha Bhosle singing "Chain Se Humko Kabhi"

External links

1974 films
1970s Hindi-language films
Films scored by O. P. Nayyar